Oleg Svyatoslavich (1052 – August 1115) was a Rurikid prince whose equivocal adventures ignited political unrest in Kievan Rus' at the turn of the 11th and 12th centuries.

Oleg was a younger son of Sviatoslav Iaroslavich, Prince of Chernigov and his first wife, Killikiya. He might have been either the second or the fourth among the four sons of Sviatoslav Iaroslavich by Killikiya, because their order of seniority is uncertain. According to historian Martin Dimnik, Oleg was born around 1050. Oleg was named after his grand uncle. His baptismal name was Michael.

Dimnik writes that "it is highly probable" that Oleg succeeded his brother, Gleb in Tmutarakan after their father appointed the latter Prince of Novgorod in about 1068. Oleg's father and uncle, Vsevolod Iaroslavich made an alliance against their elder brother, Iziaslav Iaroslavich, Grand Prince of Kiev and dethroned him on 22 March 1073. According to Dimnik, Oleg received the Principality of Vladimir from his father who succeeded Iziaslav Iaroslavich in Kiev. In short, Oleg and his cousin, Vladimir Monomachson of Vsevolod Iaroslavichbecame close friends. Monomach writes in his Instruction that Oleg was the godfather of his eldest son, Mstislav. The two cousins together commanded the troops Oleg's father sent to assist Boleslav II of Poland in Bohemia in 1076, according to the Russian Primary Chronicle.

Sviatoslav Iaroslavich died in Kiev on 27 December 1077. He was succeeded by his brother, Vsevolod Iaroslavich. The new grand prince seems to have confirmed Oleg's rule in Vladimir, because no source makes mention of a conflict between them. However, the dethroned Iziaslav IaroslavichVsevolod's brother and Oleg's unclereturned with Polish reinforcements. Iziaslav and Vsevolod had a meeting where they reached an agreement: Vsevolod renounced of Kiev, but received Chernigov, the one-time domain of Oleg's father. Iziaslav marched in Kiev on 15 July 1077, while Oleg "was with Vsevolod at Chernigov", according to the Russian Primary Chronicle. The chronicler's remark suggests that Oleg had by that time been forced to leave Vladimir.

Failing to get along with his uncle, on 10 April 1077 Oleg fled to his brother Roman who reigned in Tmutarakan. Together with his cousin, Boris Vyacheslavich, who had also settled in Tmutarakan, Oleg made an alliance with the Cumans and invaded Rus' in the summer of 1078. They routed their uncle, Vsevolod on the Sozh River and entered Chernigov on 25 August. The Russian Primary Chronicle accuses Oleg and Boris of being the first to lead "the pagans to attack the land of Rus'". However, Vladimir Monomach, in his Instruction, reveals that he and his father, Vsevolod had hired Cumans when attacking Polotsk in the previous year.

Expelled from Chernigov, Vsevolod fled to Kiev and sought assistance from his brother, Iziaslav. They united their forces and marched against Chernigov. Although Oleg and Boris were not in the town when their uncles arrived, the citizens decided to resist. Oleg was willing to start negotiations with his uncles, but Boris refused his proposal. The decisive battle was fought "at a place near a village on the meadow of Nezhata" on 3 October.

He was defeated and escaped to Tmutarakan, where the Khazars had him imprisoned and sent in chains to Constantinople. The emperor, who was a relative and ally of Vsevolod, exiled him to Rhodes. There he married a noble lady, Theophano Mouzalonissa, who bore him several children.

Four years later, we again find him active in Tmutarakan, where he adopted the title "archon of Khazaria". In 1094, he returned with the Kipchaks to Rus' and captured Chernihiv. There ensued a prolonged internecine struggle with his cousins Sviatopolk and Vladimir Monomakh. One of the most prominent princes of Kievan period who never attained the Kievan throne, he died on August 1, 1115, and was buried in Chernihiv.

The Tale of Igor's Campaign styles him Gorislavich, poetically deriving his patronymic from the Russian word for sorrow. His descendants, known as Olgovichi, were archrivals of Vladimir's descendants (known as Monomakhovichi) in their struggle for supremacy in Rus'.

His son was Igor II of Kiev.

References

Sources

The Russian Primary Chronicle: Laurentian Text (Translated and edited by Samuel Hazzard Cross and Olgerd P. Sherbowitz-Wetzor) (1953). Medieval Academy of America. .

11th-century births
1115 deaths
Princes of Vladimir
11th-century princes in Kievan Rus'
12th-century princes in Kievan Rus'
Eastern Orthodox monarchs
Princes of Tmutarakan
Olgovichi family
Rurik dynasty